Dragan Trkulja (born 30 September 1964) is a Serbian football manager and former player.

Playing career
Trkulja played for Novi Sad during the 1984–85 Yugoslav Second League. He later joined Bečej, helping the club win the Yugoslav Second League in the 1991–92 season, contributing with 14 goals in 30 appearances.

In the summer of 1992, Trkulja moved abroad and signed with SSV Ulm 1846 in the German fourth division, helping them earn promotion to the Bundesliga within seven seasons. He was the top scorer in the 1995–96 Regionalliga with 25 goals. Following the club's relegation to the German fifth division due to licensing problems, Trkulja remained with the club and helped them beat Bundesliga side 1. FC Nürnberg during the 2001–02 DFB-Pokal.

Managerial career
Trkulja served as manager of numerous German amateur clubs, including Eintracht Autenried and RSV Hohenmemmingen.

References

External links
 

1964 births
Living people
Sportspeople from Sombor
Yugoslav footballers
Serbia and Montenegro footballers
Serbian footballers
Association football forwards
RFK Novi Sad 1921 players
OFK Bečej 1918 players
SSV Ulm 1846 players
Yugoslav Second League players
Regionalliga players
2. Bundesliga players
Bundesliga players
Serbia and Montenegro expatriate footballers
Expatriate footballers in Germany
Serbia and Montenegro expatriate sportspeople in Germany
Serbian football managers
Serbian expatriate football managers
Expatriate football managers in Germany
Serbian expatriate sportspeople in Germany